The 2019 Meerbusch Challenger was a professional tennis tournament played on clay courts. It was the seventh edition of the tournament which was part of the 2019 ATP Challenger Tour. It took place in Meerbusch, Germany, between 12 and 18 August 2019.

Singles main draw entrants

Seeds

 1 Rankings as of 5 August 2019.

Other entrants
The following players received wildcards into the singles main draw:
  Kai Breitbach
  Pavle Daljev
  Lucas Gerch
  Henri Squire
  Louis Wessels

The following players received entry into the singles main draw using protected rankings:
  Íñigo Cervantes
  Aleksandre Metreveli
  Daniel Muñoz de la Nava

The following players received entry into the singles main draw using their ITF World Tennis Ranking:
  Eduard Esteve Lobato
  Christopher Heyman
  Karim-Mohamed Maamoun
  Ivan Nedelko
  Jeroen Vanneste

The following players received entry from the qualifying draw:
  Ricardo Ojeda Lara
  Mats Rosenkranz

Champions

Singles 

  Pedro Sousa def.  Peđa Krstin 7–6(7–4), 4–6, 6–3.

Doubles 

  Andre Begemann /  Florin Mergea def.  Sriram Balaji /  Vishnu Vardhan 7–6(7–1), 6–7(4–7), [10–3].

References

Meerbusch Challenger
2019
Meerbusch Challenger
August 2019 sports events in Germany